EWL may refer to:

East West MRT line, Rapid transit line in Singapore.
European Women's Lobby
Eastern Wrestling League